Irwin Welber (March 3, 1924 – December 17, 2016) was an American electrical engineer who served as the ninth president of Sandia Corporation (a subsidiary of Bell Labs which managed the Sandia Laboratory).

Early life and career
Welber was born on March 3, 1924, in Amsterdam, New York, and received a BS in electrical engineering from Union College in 1948.  He received an MS in electrical engineering from Rensselaer Polytechnic Institute in 1950. In 1950, he started his career at Bell Labs. From February 1986 to March 1989, he served as president of Sandia Corporation (which managed the Sandia Laboratory). He was elected to the National Academy of Engineering in 1988.

References

External links
 Obituary at legacy.com

1924 births
2016 deaths
Scientists from New York (state)
Members of the United States National Academy of Engineering
United States Department of Energy National Laboratories personnel
Union College (New York) alumni
Rensselaer Polytechnic Institute alumni